Juan Carlos Medina Alonso (born 22 August 1983) is a Mexican former professional footballer who played as a midfielder.

Club career
Juan Carlos Medina debuted with Atlas on 31 August 2003 in a league match against Tecos UAG. With Atlas, he made 160 league appearances, scoring eleven goals. In 2008, Medina was transferred to league giants Club América. He had an unsuccessful first stint with América, being loaned out to clubs Monterrey and San Luis. In 2011 Medina returned to América, only to make three appearances in the Apertura tournament, in which the club finished in an abysmal 17th place. After the arrival of coach Miguel Herrera, his former coach whilst at Monterrey, Medina began to see more playing time, and eventually cemented his place in América's starting-eleven. On 26 May 2013 he played in his first league final against Cruz Azul, playing the whole match. América won the final on penalties, and were crowned champions. This would be Medina's first league championship as a player. Medina announced his retirement on June 11, 2018.

International career

Youth
Medina was a squad member at the 2003 FIFA U-20 World Cup held in the United Arab Emirates. in which he played 3 matches.

Senior
Medina played three games in 2003 with the Mexican U-20 team, and he played his first game with the senior team in 2004. His good form brought him a first summons to the national team under new coach Hugo Sánchez. His first game was in a 3–1 win against Venezuela on 28 February 2007. During the match, Medina was able to earn a crucial penalty for the Mexican side, as he was knocked down in the box. In 2013, he returned to the national team against Finland. Then Miguel Herrera called Medina for the qualifying games against New Zealand.

Medina made the final roster selection for the 2014 FIFA World Cup however during the national team training camp he suffered an injury and was replaced by Miguel Angel Ponce.

Career statistics

International

Honours
América
Liga MX: Clausura 2013

References

External links
 

1983 births
Living people
Footballers from Coahuila
Mexican footballers
Mexico international footballers
Mexico under-20 international footballers
Mexico youth international footballers
Liga MX players
Atlas F.C. footballers
Club América footballers
C.F. Monterrey players
San Luis F.C. players
Sportspeople from Torreón
2015 Copa América players
Association football midfielders